Ian Elliott (born 11 January 1938) is a British rower. He competed in the men's eight event at the 1960 Summer Olympics.

References

1938 births
Living people
British male rowers
Olympic rowers of Great Britain
Rowers at the 1960 Summer Olympics
Sportspeople from Birmingham, West Midlands